The chancellor of the Duchy of Lancaster is a ministerial office in the Government of the United Kingdom. Excluding the prime minister, the chancellor is the highest ranking minister in the Cabinet Office, immediately after the Prime Minister, and senior to the Minister for the Cabinet Office. The role includes as part of its duties the administration of the estates and rents of the Duchy of Lancaster.

Formally, the chancellor of the Duchy of Lancaster is appointed by the Sovereign on the advice of the prime minister, and is answerable to Parliament for the governance of the Duchy. In modern times, however, the involvement of the chancellor in the running of the day-to-day affairs of the Duchy is slight, and the office is held by a senior politician whose main role is usually quite different. In practical terms, it is a sinecure, allowing the prime minister to appoint an additional minister without portfolio to the Cabinet of the United Kingdom. In September 2021 the role was endowed with responsibility for advising the prime minister on policy development and implementation, particularly around Brexit.

The corresponding shadow minister is the shadow chancellor of the Duchy of Lancaster.

History

Originally, the chancellor was the chief officer in the daily management of the Duchy of Lancaster and the County Palatine of Lancaster (a county palatine merged into the Crown in 1399), but that estate is now run by a deputy, leaving the chancellor as a member of the Cabinet with little obligation in regard to the chancellorship. The position has often been given to a senior Cabinet minister with responsibilities in a particular area of policy for which there is no department with an appropriate portfolio.

In 1491 the office of Vice-Chancellor of the County Palatine of Lancaster was created. The position is now held by a judge of the Chancery Division of the High Court of Justice, who sits in the north west of England, and is no longer appointed to that position as legal officer of the Duchy.

Modern times
Under the Promissory Oaths Act 1868, the chancellor is required to take the oath of allegiance and the Official Oath. The holder of the sinecure is a minister without portfolio; Sir Oswald Mosley, for example, focused on unemployment after being appointed to the position in 1929 during the second MacDonald ministry.

After the Dardanelles campaign, Winston Churchill was in 1915 appointed Chancellor of the Duchy of Lancaster, a humiliating loss of the trappings of power.

The chancellor of the Duchy of Lancaster is entitled to a salary under the Ministerial and other Salaries Act 1975, but section 3 of the Act provides that the salary "shall be reduced by the amount of the salary payable to him otherwise than out of moneys so provided in respect of his office". The Office of the chancellor of the Duchy of Lancaster is part of the Cabinet Office.

From 1997 until 2009, the holder of the title also served as the Minister for the Cabinet Office.  This applied in the case of Alan Milburn, who was given the title by Prime Minister Tony Blair in 2004 and at the same time rejoined the Cabinet. However, in the reshuffle of 5 June 2009, the chancellorship went to the Leader of the House of Lords, the Baroness Royall. In David Cameron's first cabinet, the chancellorship remained with the leader of the House of Lords until 2014.

When David Lidington was appointed Chancellor on 8 January 2018, the position of Minister for the Cabinet Office was once again held concurrently. This continued until Michael Gove was appointed Chancellor in July 2019. Michael Gove was given responsibility over the Cabinet Office, but did not initially hold the ministerial position of Minister for the Cabinet Office (which is not on a statutory footing), though he was later granted that title in the 2020 Cabinet reshuffle.

Steve Barclay was appointed to the post on 15 September 2021 as part of the  2021 reshuffle. He had previously been the last Secretary of State for the Department for Exiting the European Union. Steve Barclay held the office concurrently with the Minister for the Cabinet Office until February 2022 when he was appointed Downing Street Chief of Staff. The position of Minister for the Cabinet Office was given to Michael Ellis instead whilst Barclay retained the post of Chancellor of the Duchy.

Kit Malthouse succeeded Steve Barclay as Chancellor in the 2022 reshuffle on 7 July 2022.

Nadhim Zahawi was appointed Chancellor of the Duchy of Lancaster on 6 September 2022, under the UK's shortest-serving Prime Minister, Liz Truss.

Oliver Dowden was appointed to the role, in new Prime Minister Rishi Sunak's first cabinet, on 25 October 2022.

Responsibilities
In addition to administering the estates and rents of the Duchy of Lancaster, the chancellor is also a member of the cabinet and advises the prime minister on the development and implementation of government policy. In addition, the Chancellor is presently responsible for:

 Chairing and deputy chairing Cabinet committees
 Implementing government business
 Overseeing committees and implementation taskforces, devolution consequences of the United Kingdom's exit from the European Union, and constitutional affairs
 Providing oversight to all Cabinet Office policies

Chancellors of the Duchy of Lancaster

See also
 Lord Keeper of the Privy Seal
 Minister without portfolio
 County Palatine of Lancaster

Notes

 This article contains quotations from this source, which is available under the  Open Government Licence v3.0. © Crown copyright.

Ceremonial officers in the United Kingdom

Executive ministers
Lists of government ministers of the United Kingdom
Ministerial offices in the United Kingdom